Horace Huntley is a retired professor from the University of Alabama, Birmingham (UAB) in the School of Social and Behavioral Sciences. Dr. Huntley has worked extensively as a historian in the fields of Civil Rights, Labor History, Black History and African American Studies. He was the inaugural Director of the Oral History Project of the Birmingham Civil Rights Institute.

Research and Publications 
Huntley worked at the Birmingham Civil Rights Institute researching and interpreting oral histories for a book, Black Workers' Struggle for Equality in Birmingham, which he authored with Yale University historian David Montgomery. The book, which was published in 2004 cataloged the relationships between African-American workers and labor unions in the post-Civil Rights American South.  He also authored A Master Option Trader's Journey From Pipe Shop To Wall Street - The Life and Times of Terry Harris in 2005 which tells the story of a young black man, born in Bessemer, Alabama who teaches himself the art of option trading on Wall Street and then develops a system to teach other poor people the same. 
In 2006, he co-authored Nerve Juice And The Ivory Tower - Confrontation in Minnesota - The True Story Of The Morrill Hall Takeover which tells the story of a black student's quest at the University of Minnesota for a Black Studies Department.  The co-authors are Marie Braddock Williams and Rose Freeman Massey who were part of a small group of black students occupied the University of Minnesota's administration building demanding African American Studies, open admissions and increased financial and academic resources for black and non-white students. Huntley also co-authored Footsoldiers for Democracy

Personal life and education 
Huntley is a native of Birmingham, Alabama and graduate of Wenonah High School.  He was one of the first recipients of the Baccalaureate Degree in African American Studies from the University of Minnesota.  He earned a Master's degree from Syracuse University and a doctorate from the University of Pittsburgh.  Huntley developed the minor in African American Studies at UAB and for more than twenty-five years has offered a series of courses on the experiences of Africans of the diaspora.  In addition, Huntley has served as an Alabama Humanities Foundation Scholar, on the Birmingham Civil Rights Institute Task Force, as a founding member of the Institute (BCRI).  He is the Director of the Oral History Project for BCRI. He served on the Birmingham Historical Commission, the Birmingham Historical Society and as an evaluator of the Fellowship Office of the National Research Council of the National Science Foundation.

Lawsuit 
According to an article in The Birmingham News dated December 4, 2008 Professor Huntley has sued the University of Alabama at Birmingham, claiming the school has discriminated against him and denied him fair pay because of his race and age.  He also claims, in the lawsuit filed in federal court Tuesday, that UAB "has a policy .¤.¤. of discriminating against black persons with respect to recruitment, hiring, compensation, promotions, discipline, training, discharge, pay, fringe benefits and other terms and conditions of employment."

References

External links 

Year of birth missing (living people)
Living people
Writers from Birmingham, Alabama
University of Minnesota College of Liberal Arts alumni
Syracuse University alumni
University of Pittsburgh alumni
University of Alabama at Birmingham faculty
21st-century American historians
21st-century American male writers
Historians from New York (state)
American male non-fiction writers